Dar al-Magana is a 14th-century building in Fes, Morocco, built by the Marinid Sultan Abu Inan Faris which houses a weight-powered water clock. It is located opposite the Bou Inania Madrasa on Tala'a Kebira street and was created to serve that madrasa and its mosque, which was also built by Abu Inan around the same time. 

The building is also sometimes referred to as the "House of Maimonides" due to a popular legend which claims that the house was once the residence of the famous Jewish philosopher Maimonides.

History 

The clock was part of the large charitable complex centered around the Bou Inania Madrasa built by the Marinid sultan Abu Inan. According to its foundation inscription, construction on the madrasa itself started on December 28, 1350 CE (28 Ramadan 751 AH) and finished in 1355 (756 AH). According to the historical chronicler al-Jazna'i, the water clock was completed on 6 May 1357 (14 Djumada al-awwal, 758 AH). The designer of the clock was a muwaqqit named Abu al-Hassan ibn Ali Ahmed el-Tlemsani. The clock may have followed similar principles as that of an earlier water clock built for the Dar al-Muwaqqit of the Qarawiyyin Mosque by Sultan Abu Said in 1317.

Description 

The clock consists of 12 windows and platforms carrying brass bowls. The motion of the clock was presumably maintained by a kind of small cart which ran from left to right behind the twelve doors. At one end, the cart was attached to a rope with a hanging weight; at the other end to a rope with a weight that floated on the surface of a water reservoir that was drained at a regular pace. Each hour one of the doors opened; at the same time a metal ball was dropped into one of the twelve brass bowls. The rafters sticking out of the building above the doors (similar to the rafters of the Bou Inania Madrasa) supported a small roof to shield the doors and bowls. The facade of the building is decorated with carved stucco around the windows and by sculpted arabesque and epigraphic motifs on the wooden rafters and corbels.

State of preservation 
The clock has been defunct for generations and a lack of documentation and collective memory about its exact functioning has impeded efforts to repair it. The bowls have been removed since 2004 with the aim of repairing or reconstructing its mechanism, though the project, managed by ADER-Fes (a foundation for the restoration of monuments in Fes), has been unsuccessful in this regard so far. The structure and facade of the house itself was also restored in the early 2000s.

See also
Clock of Ridwan al-Saati
Elephant clock of al-Jazari
Dar al-Muwaqqit

Notes

References

Further reading
Ricard P. 1924. "L'Horloge de la Médersa Bou-Anania de Fès" in: Bulletin de la Société de Géographie d'Alger et de l'Afrique du Nord, vol. 25: pp. 248–254.
D.J. de Solla Price, "Mechanical Waterclocks of the 14th Century in Fez, Morocco" in: Proceedings of the Tenth International Congress of the History of Science (Ithaca, N.Y, 1962). Paris: Hermann, pp. 599–602.
Tazi, Rajae, "L’horloge Hydraulique Bouanania, une énigme enfin perçue par des spécialistes du patrimoine" in Jeunes Du Maroc, Portail des Jeunes, December 16, 2004 
Tazi, Abdelhadi 1981-85. "L'horloge hydraulique." In: Le mémorial du Maroc. Rabat: Editions Nord, vol. 3, pp. 53–71.
Hill, D.R. 1976. On the Construction of Water Clocks. Kitāb Arshimīdas fī ‘amal al-binkāmāt. London: Turner & Devereaux.
Hill, D.R. 1981. Arabic Water-Clocks. Aleppo: Institute for the History of Arabic Science.

External links

Historical photos of Dar al-Magana on Marocantan.com  , Dafina.net  and Flickr  with bowls still in place (retrieved November 16, 2008)

Buildings and structures completed in 1357
Buildings and structures in Fez, Morocco
Marinid architecture
Individual clocks
Houses in Morocco